Josef Dvořáček is a male former international table tennis player from Czechoslovakia. 

He won a bronze medal at the 1973 World Table Tennis Championships in the mixed doubles with Alice Grofova.

See also
 List of table tennis players
 List of World Table Tennis Championships medalists

References

Czechoslovak table tennis players
1952 births
Living people
World Table Tennis Championships medalists